Otley Museum is in the town of Otley, near Leeds in West Yorkshire, England.  Founded in 1961, it holds a collection of objects, artefacts and documentary material relating to the development of Otley and the surrounding District since the prehistoric period. These include prehistoric stone tools and artefacts; an archaeological collection from the excavations of the Palace of the Archbishop of York at Otley; The Otley Printers' Engineers Collection; The Urban Development Archive, and an archive representing the Social History of Otley from the 18th Century onwards.  The Otley Museum is independent, and managed and run entirely by volunteers.

Until early 2010, two rooms in the Otley Civic Centre housed the museum's eclectic collection of objects depicting the history of Otley and its surrounding District from prehistoric times through Anglo Saxon and Viking era, into the medieval period, and documenting its development from a rural community to a Victorian industrial town, and into the 20th century. When the museum had to vacate those rooms, these artefacts were placed in secure storage.

References

External links 
 
 Entry for the Museum in the National Archives as of 2004. Contact the Museum directly for current information.
 Search results in the National Archives database for Otley Museum holdings. Contact the Museum directly for current information.

Museums in Leeds
Local museums in West Yorkshire
Otley